Princess Elizabeth Hospital (PEH) is a hospital in the parish of Saint Martin in Guernsey.

History 
The hospital was opened by the then Princess Elizabeth on 23 June 1949.

Facilities 
The hospital is made up of 12 wards and has 104 beds.

References

External links 
 

Hospitals in Guernsey